Nathan Proller (August 20, 1901 – May 23, 1994) was an American businessman and politician from New York.

Life
He was born on August 20, 1901, in Gloversville, Fulton County, New York, the son of Hyman H. Proller (died 1948) and Rebecca Proller (1876–1972). He attended Corinth High School and the Wharton School of the University of Pennsylvania. He engaged in the real estate and insurance business in  Glens Falls, and entered politics as a Republican. He was Supervisor of the Town of Lake Luzerne for several terms; and was Chairman of the Board of Supervisors of Warren County from 1937 to 1939.

Proller was a member of the New York State Senate in 1965 and 1966. In June 1966, after re-apportionment, he ran in the 42nd District for re-nomination, but was defeated in the Republican primary by Ronald B. Stafford, the incumbent senator from the 48th District.

He died on May 23, 1994.

Sources

1901 births
1994 deaths
Politicians from Glens Falls, New York
Republican Party New York (state) state senators
Wharton School of the University of Pennsylvania alumni
Town supervisors in New York (state)
People from Gloversville, New York
20th-century American politicians